Mass Destruction is the first single from the fourth album by British electronic music band Faithless, No Roots (2004). It was released on 31 May 2004 and reached number seven on the UK Singles Chart. In Australia, the song was ranked number 41 on Triple J's Hottest 100 of 2004.

Track listings
UK CD single
 "Mass Destruction" (single mix) – 3:32
 "Mass Destruction" (Paul Jackson's Big Weapon Mix) – 7:29
 "Mass Destruction" (Tom Middleton Cosmos Mix) – 7:52
 "Mass Destruction" (Paul Jackson's Destruction Dub) – 6:57
 "Mass Destruction" (Tom Middleton Cosmos Dub) – 7:52
 
UK and Dutch low-price CD single
 "Mass Destruction" (single mix) – 3:32
 "We Come 1" – 3:43

European and Australian single
 "Mass Destruction" (single mix) – 3:32
 "Mass Destruction" (Paul Jackson's Big Weapon Mix) – 7:29
 "Mass Destruction" (Tom Middleton Cosmos Mix) – 7:52
 "Mass Destruction" (video) – 3:36

Charts

Weekly charts

Year-end charts

References

 FaithlessWeb.com
 Faithless / Rollo / Sister Bliss & related artists - Unofficial Discography

Faithless songs
2004 singles
2004 songs
Bertelsmann Music Group singles
Cheeky Records singles
Songs written by Maxi Jazz
Songs written by P-Nut
Songs written by Rollo Armstrong
Songs written by Sister Bliss